Eagle ( in Hän Athabascan) is a village on the south bank of the Yukon River near the Canada–US border in the Southeast Fairbanks Census Area, Alaska, United States. It includes the Eagle Historic District, a U.S. National Historic Landmark. The population was 86 at the 2010 census. Every February, Eagle hosts a checkpoint for the long-distance Yukon Quest sled dog race.

Geography

Eagle is on the southern bank of the Yukon River at the end of the Taylor Highway, near Yukon–Charley Rivers National Preserve.

Climate
Like most of Alaska, Eagle has a subarctic climate (Köppen Dwc) with long, severely cold, dry winters occasionally moderated by chinook winds, and short, warm summers. In the absence of chinook moderation, winter temperatures can be dangerously cold: in the notoriously cold month of December 1917, the temperature did not rise above  and it averaged . When chinooks occur, winter temperatures can get above , doing so on an average of five days per winter.

History
For thousands of years prior to Europeans arriving in Alaska, the Eagle area was home to many indigenous peoples, including the Han.

The first known American-built structure in Eagle was a log trading post called "Belle Isle", erected around 1874. Subsequently, in the late 1800s, Eagle became a supply and trading center for miners working the upper Yukon River and its tributaries. By the year 1898, Eagle’s population had exceeded 1,700 persons; many newcomers journeyed to the area with word of the Klondike Gold Rush.

In 1901, Eagle became the first incorporated city of the Alaska Interior. It was named for the many eagles that nested on nearby Eagle Bluff. A United States Army camp, Fort Egbert, was built at Eagle in 1900. A telegraph line between Eagle and Valdez was completed in 1903. In 1905, Roald Amundsen arrived in Eagle and telegraphed the news of the Northwest Passage to the rest of the world.

The ensuing gold rushes in Nome and Fairbanks eventually lured people away from Eagle. In 1903, Judge James Wickersham moved the Third Division court from Eagle to Fairbanks. By 1910, Eagle's population had declined to its present-day level, below 200 people. Fort Egbert was abandoned in 1911.

Present-day Eagle is home to (mostly) people of European descent; nearby Eagle Village has a small population that is about 50 percent Han.

The town enjoyed some notoriety, as the setting of John McPhee's book Coming into the Country, first published in 1977 and becoming quite popular. Many of the buildings from the Gold Rush years are preserved as part of the Eagle Historic District, a National Historic Landmark district.

The Eagle area also is one of the locales featured on the National Geographic Channel series Life Below Zero.

Demographics

Eagle first appeared on the 1900 U.S. Census as Eagle City, although it was not incorporated until the following year. It was shortened to Eagle in the following census.

As of the census of 2000, there were 129 people, 58 households, and 37 families residing in the city. The racial makeup of the city was 93.02% White, 6.20% Native American, and 0.78% from two or more races. 0.78% of the population were Hispanic or Latino of any race.

Of the 58 households, 20.7% had children under the age of 18 living with them, 55.2% were married couples living together, 6.9% had a female householder with no husband present, and 36.2% were non-families. 34.5% of all households were made up of individuals, and 5.2% had someone living alone who was 65 years of age or older. The average household size was 2.22 and the average family size was 2.86.

In the city the population was spread out, with 24.8% under the age of 18, 3.1% from 18 to 24, 24.0% from 25 to 44, 44.2% from 45 to 64, and 3.9% who were 65 years of age or older. The median age was 44 years. For every 100 females there were 95.5 males. For every 100 females age 18 and over, there were 98.0 males.

The median income for a household in the city was $36,042, and the median income for a family was $44,375. Males had a median income of $30,000 versus $20,000 for females. The per capita income for the city was $20,221. There were 2.6% of families and 16.5% of the population living below the poverty line, including 40.0% of under eighteens and none of those over 64.

Education
In the 1970s high school-aged children took correspondence courses from the University of Nebraska-Lincoln, with a local resident supervising their work.  Eagle is now part of the Alaska Gateway School District. Eagle School, a K–12 campus, serves city students.

Eagle Historic District

The Eagle Historic District is a well-preserved example of the historic development in Northern Alaska. Fort Egbert was built in 1889 to serve a central governmental role for the area. Over 100 buildings from this era survive including the Federal courthouse which was funded by fines enacted against the rowdy inhabitants. The district was added to the National Register of Historic Places on October 27, 1970 and was designated as a National Historic Landmark on June 2, 1978.

See also
List of National Historic Landmarks in Alaska
National Register of Historic Places listings in Southeast Fairbanks Census Area, Alaska

References

External links 

 "Fort Egbert and the Eagle Historic District summer-1977: Results of Archeological and Historic Research" by Anne Shinkwin, Elizabeth Andrews, Russell Sackett, and Mary Kroul

Cities in Alaska
Cities in Southeast Fairbanks Census Area, Alaska
Mining communities in Alaska
Populated places established in 1874
Yukon River
1874 establishments in Alaska
Historic districts on the National Register of Historic Places in Alaska
National Historic Landmark Districts
Hän